Ashreigney is a village and civil parish in the Torridge district of Devon, England, about 15 miles south of the town of Barnstaple.  According to the 2001 census it had a population of 446, compared to 540 in 1901.

The church is mostly fifteenth century and has a medieval font. The village was recorded in the Domesday Book.

Within the parish is the small settlement of Riddlecombe, which was a medieval manor.

References

External links 

 Devon Local Studies - Ashreigney community page
 Genuki Ashreigney page
 Ashreigney parish website
 

Ashreigney
Torridge District